Andrew Ferguson (born 1 May 1992) is a Canadian rugby union player who plays as a scrum half for the Toronto Arrows in Major League Rugby (MLR) and for Canada internationally.

References

1992 births
Living people
Canada international rugby union players
Canadian rugby union players
Rugby union scrum-halves
Sportspeople from Mississauga
Toronto Arrows players